Lake Highland Preparatory School is a private, coeducational school in Orlando, Florida. It was founded as an all-white school in 1970 by the board of a whites-only, Christians-only junior college. This gave white parents a private alternative to racially-integrated public schools at the time federal courts had finally required mixing races in public schools. It is the largest private school in Orlando and the fourth-largest private school in the state. It serves grades pre-K through 12, separated into lower (grades pre-K to 6), middle (grades 7–8), and upper schools (grades 9–12).

The  main campus is next to Lake Highland. The school also has a middle school campus (Charles Clayton Campus) for grades 7 and 8.

Lake Highland is accredited by the Florida Council of Independent Schools and the Southern Association of Colleges and Schools. The school is also a member of the National Association of Independent Schools.

History
Lake Highland Preparatory School traces its origins to Orlando Junior College, which was established in 1941 "as a private community college to serve white residents". By the 1960s, the junior college's board of trustees had rejected at least two deals that would have given money to the school if it began admitting black and Jewish students, including an offer of $1 million 
(roughly $ today) from defense contractor Martin Company and a similar attempt two years later by the state of Florida. By the late 1960s, the school's enrollment had "declined dramatically" following the arrival of two public, integrated community colleges in the region. In 1969, OJC board members voted down a proposal to sell the campus to the expanding Valencia Junior College, electing instead to rebrand the junior college as College of Orlando—the school had long envisioned a shift to a four-year college—and to open a new private school for elementary, middle, and high schoolers.

Lake Highland Preparatory School opened in 1970 during the racial integration of Orlando-area public schools, following a pattern common to segregation academies. Plans for the school were publicly announced in February 1970; the chairman of the board of trustees, Joseph Guernsey, declined to comment when a reporter asked if the school was established to allow white parents to avoid racially integrated public schools. In August 1970, days before the school opened, headmaster Terrence O'Hara told a PTA meeting that an "air of uncertainty over public schools" contributed to the growing enrollment at racially segregated private schools like LHPS. O'Hara said, "Some parents don't even know what public school they are to send their children to" and this "confusion" meant the parents "felt more secure with their children in private schools."

Classes began on September 9, 1970, with 325 students in grades 1 to 12, including 23 seniors. None were black. Tuition was $425 per semester ($ in today's dollars).

In March 1971, Chairman Guernsey announced that a fundraising drive had brought $300,000 in donations and pledges, that applications for enrollment were coming in so quickly that the student body might have to be capped at 800, and that tuition would increase to $550 per semester. He added that the junior college would close in August 1971, leaving the entire 26-acre campus to the prep school.

O'Hara left the headmaster's post after a year, as did his successor, Lowell Keene.

In 1972, the school found the man who would lead it into its second decade. As superintendent of Orange County Public Schools, James Higginbotham had resisted court orders to desegregate Robinswood Middle School and Carver Middle School. In May, Higginbotham resigned to accept the newly created post of president of Lake Highland Preparatory School. On his first day in his new job, he gave a speech in which he denounced the court order desegregating public schools, saying that "an era was dying" because of "legalistic do-gooders."

In 1976, a school spokesperson said black students were welcome, but none had ever applied or enrolled.

In 1981, Guernsey stepped down as board chairman. He was succeeded by Charles E. Bradshaw Jr., who had joined the board of the whites-only junior college in the late 1960s and subsequently helped lead the drive to establish the prep school. Bradshaw would serve as chair until 2005. The Upper and Lower School campus was renamed for him in 2011.

Higginbotham died in office in 1982; he was succeeded as school president by Charles Millican, founding president of what is today University of Central Florida. The current president is James McIntyre, hired in 2022. He replaced Alfred Harms Jr., a retired vice admiral.

As of the 2019-2020 school year, the school reported a total student body of 1,950 students, of whom 1,260 were White, 430 were Asian, 123 were Black, 77 were Hispanic, and one was Native Hawaiian/Pacific Islander.

Athletics

LHPS athletic teams are called the Highlanders.  Former head football coach Frank Prendergast serves as the school's athletic director.  In 2012, 27 of the school's 200 graduating seniors signed to play for college teams.  The Highlanders compete in various districts of the Florida High School Athletic Association: mostly 1A, but the football team competes in 2B and the basketball, baseball, softball, and soccer teams in 3A.

Most athletics facilities are located on campus. Football and soccer teams play on Holloway Field at CNL Stadium (often shortened to "CNL Stadium" or "the Field"), while the basketball and volleyball teams compete inside the Weng Family Gymnasium (commonly referred to as "the Gym"). The baseball team plays across from Lake Highland in the O'Meara sports complex.

Historically, Trinity Preparatory School has been Lake Highland's primary athletic rival, mirroring their academic rivalry. Recently, Lake Highland moved out of Trinity's division, thus ending the annual football rivalry.  Lake Highland and Trinity still participate in the same division in most other sports.   Bishop Moore High School has supplanted Trinity as LHP's annual football rival.

Former major league baseball pitcher Frank Viola spent 10 years coaching at Lake Highland, six of them as head baseball coach.

Lake Highland Prep has 28 state championships across 11 sports. The boys wrestling team, which won in 2012, 2013, 2015, 2016, 2017, 2018, and 2019, holds the state tournament point-scoring records and also won the first and second team dual state championships in 2018 and 2019. Other state championships have been won in girls volleyball (2004, 2005, 2006, 2007, and 2008), girls basketball (1998, 2015, and 2016), girls softball (2002 and 2003), boys basketball (2013 and 2014), Boys Soccer (2019) girls soccer (2006), boys lacrosse (2011, 2013, 2014, and 2015), girls lacrosse (2019), girls swim (2004), and girls golf (2001). The girls 200 medley relay and girls 400 free relay teams were state champions in 2017. Lake Highland Prep also holds 15 Orlando Sentinel Varsity Cup “Super Six” awards from 2002 to 2016.

In May 2020, the school's wrestling program left the FHSAA in order to compete as an independent and with a national schedule starting with the 2020–2021 academic year. Lake Highland competed at tournaments in Ohio, Delaware, California, and Illinois during the 2019–2020 season. State guidelines only allow one meet per season outside Florida and neighboring states Georgia and Alabama. The move means the school will no longer compete for state titles, but instead compete at the National Prep Championships.

Notable alumni

Noted former students include:
 Candice Accola, actress
 Annalena Baerbock, German politician, appointed Minister for Foreign Affairs in 2021
 Joel Berry II, basketball player for the North Carolina Tar Heels, McDonald's All-American and 3x Florida Mr. Basketball
 John Green, author and YouTuber
 Traylor Howard, television actress
 Dominique Rodgers-Cromartie, defensive back for the New York Giants (sophomore year only)
 Max Starks, a former offensive tackle for the Pittsburgh Steelers, San Diego Chargers, Saint Louis Rams, and Arizona Cardinals.
 Scott Stapp, lead singer of Creed
 Mark Tremonti, lead guitarist of Creed and Alter Bridge
 Ty Tryon, professional golfer
 Brittany Viola, NCAA champion diver
 Brice Sensabaugh, basketball player, Ohio State Buckeyes

References

External links

Official website
2012 Interview with Joseph S. Guernsey, founding chairman of the board of trustees of Lake Highland Preparatory School. Page includes information about Orlando Junior College, including a 1967 "Declarations of Principles"

Private high schools in Florida
High schools in Orange County, Florida
Schools in Orlando, Florida
Private middle schools in Florida
Private elementary schools in Florida
1970 establishments in Florida
Educational institutions established in 1970
Segregation academies in Florida